Salvatore Lanna (born 31 July 1976 in Carpi, Modena) is the Italian association football former player who spent his career playing as a defender. He is currently the assistant coach of Palermo.

Biography

Playing career

From Chievo to Torino

He is one of the most famous players in the history of Chievo, having played there for eleven seasons.

After Chievo were relegated to Serie B in 2007, he was transferred to Torino on a three-year contract.

In August 2008, newly promoted Bologna agreed a fee with Torino to sign Lanna in a co-ownership deal.

Reggiana 
He has played for Reggiana from the 2010–11 season until the end of December 2011.

Italian national 
Late in 2002, he was called up twice to the Italian national team by their then-coach Giovanni Trapattoni, but he did not get to play a game either time.

Coaching career
On 3 January 2012 he was announced as new assistant coach of Reggiana in Lega Pro Prima Divisione.

In December 2016, he was named the new assistant coach of Palermo as part of Eugenio Corini's backroom staff. He left the club following Corini's resignations in January 2017.

He successively followed Corini on his coaching experiences at Novara, Brescia and Lecce. In August 2022, he again followed Corini after he agreed to return at Palermo.

References

External links

ChievoVerona.it 

1976 births
Living people
Sportspeople from Carpi, Emilia-Romagna
Italian footballers
Italian football managers
Reggina 1914 players
A.C. ChievoVerona players
Torino F.C. players
Bologna F.C. 1909 players
Serie A players
Serie B players
Association football defenders
Footballers from Emilia-Romagna